Francis Merewether may refer to:
 Francis Merewether (English politician)
 Francis Merewether (Australian politician)